Canada Square is a square at Canary Wharf, on the Isle of Dogs in London's Docklands. It is in the London Borough of Tower Hamlets in the East End of Central London along the River Thames.  Canada Square is surrounded by three of the tallest buildings in the United Kingdom, including One Canada Square, which was the tallest building in the United Kingdom from 1990 until late 2010, when it was surpassed by The Shard.

The complex is named for Canada by Olympia and York, the original developers of the site owned by the Reichmann family of Toronto.

The complex and the square is served by Canary Wharf Underground station on the Jubilee line and Canary Wharf DLR station on the Docklands Light Railway.

Buildings over 60 metres

See also
 Trafalgar Square
 Canary Wharf

References

External links
 Canada Square
 Canary Wharf

Canary Wharf buildings
Squares in the London Borough of Tower Hamlets
Streets in the London Borough of Tower Hamlets
Tourist attractions in the London Borough of Tower Hamlets